William Hough (4 March 1908 – ?) was a Welsh professional footballer. He played six seasons for Preston North End before joining Blackburn Rovers in 1937. Characterized as a "steady rather than a showy player",  Hough established himself in the right-back position and helped Preston North End get promoted to the First Division in the 1933-34 season. He suffered a series of injuries and didn't see much playing time until his transfer to Blackburn. He subsequently helped Blackburn get promoted to the First Division in the 1938-39 season. He played in the Blackburn side that faced West Ham in the 1940 Football League War Cup Final.

References

External links

1908 births
People from Holywell, Flintshire
Sportspeople from Flintshire
Welsh footballers
Blackburn Rovers F.C. players
Preston North End F.C. players
English Football League players
Year of death missing
Association football fullbacks